Pentagram is an American heavy metal band from Alexandria, Virginia, most famous as one of the pioneers of heavy metal, and the sub-genre of doom metal in particular. As such, they are considered one of the "big four of doom metal", alongside Candlemass, Saint Vitus and Trouble. The band was prolific in the underground scene of the 1970s, producing many demos and rehearsal tapes, but did not release a full-length album until reforming in the early 1980s with an almost completely new line-up. Throughout the band's history the only constant member has been vocalist Bobby Liebling. The revolving line-up of Pentagram has featured many well-respected musicians in the local doom metal scene, with members spending time in other acts such as the Obsessed, Place of Skulls, Internal Void, Spirit Caravan, among many others. The band's current line-up consists of Liebling (vocals), Matt Goldsborough (guitar), Greg Turley (bass) and "Minnesota" Pete Campbell (drums).

The 1970s 

In 1971, Bobby Liebling and Geof O'Keefe decided to leave their previous bands (Shades of Darkness and Space Meat, respectively) to form a new band that reflected their interest in emerging metal and hard rock acts such as UFO, Black Sabbath, Uriah Heep, Blue Cheer, and Sir Lord Baltimore. At Liebling's suggestion, the group was named Pentagram, a name that reflected the gloomy subject matter of their material. Although the band would change its name several times during 1971 and 1972 (Virgin Death, Macabre, and Wicked Angel were all considered during this period), they would eventually (and permanently) return to Pentagram. Contrary to popular belief, they were never called 'Stonebunny'; this was the name given to Space Meat when Liebling joined them briefly.

During their five-year career, they were represented by seven different managers, including Gordon Fletcher, a Washington, D.C. rock journalist who wrote for magazines such as Rolling Stone, Creem and Circus. The others were Steve Lorber, Phillip Knudsen, Skip Groff, Bob Fowler, Tim Kidwell and Tom McGuire.

Early line-ups
The initial Pentagram line-up consisted of Liebling (vocals), O'Keefe (guitar), Vincent McAllister (bass), and Steve Martin (drums). Early practices included the long-time standard "Livin' in a Ram's Head", along with several other long-lasting Pentagram stalwarts.

After a month of rehearsals, Space Meat alumnus John Jennings joined to create Pentagram's dual-guitar "Mark II" line-up. It soon became clear that Martin's jazz-influenced drumming did not fit Pentagram's hard-rocking style, and so he was asked to leave the group. His position was filled by guitarist O'Keefe, reprising the role of drummer he had previously enjoyed in Space Meat.

This "Mark III" line-up of Pentagram was a strong one, and at the time, it seemed like Pentagram had found a permanent line-up. However, after this line-up's first rehearsal, Jennings called O'Keefe to tell him that he was leaving the group, citing a lack of interest in heavy music as his reason for departure. After a few rehearsals without a guitarist, bassist McAllister picked up a guitar and amazed Liebling and O'Keefe with frenzied, feedback-laden soloing. McAllister would go on to become Pentagram's guitarist for the next five years.  Later McAllister would leave for California (1980) to attend classes at the Guitar Institute of Technology and Jennings would subsequently collaborate with Mary Chapin Carpenter during the 1980s and into the 1990s as her primary guitarist.

The Ram Family 

On Christmas Day 1971, this Pentagram line-up began rehearsing, with Liebling on vocals, McAllister on guitar, Greg Mayne (formerly of Space Meat) on bass, and O'Keefe on drums. In mid-1974, rhythm guitarist Randy Palmer joined the "Ram Family", as the group was known, but left in January 1975 due to drug problems, and the group once again continued on as a quartet.

Thanks to manager Gordon Fletcher's industry connections, the group had several "close calls" in the following years, with regard to a recording contract. On April 29, 1975, Fletcher persuaded Sandy Pearlman and Murray Krugman (producer and manager of Blue Öyster Cult) to see them rehearse. Impressed, the two arranged a demo session at Columbia Studios in New York City in September. Unfortunately, the session went sour after a conflict between Liebling and Krugman over a point of production, and the group's major label hopes were dashed. The group also rehearsed in front of Kiss members Gene Simmons and Paul Stanley in December 1975, but the Kiss camp was unimpressed by the group's lack of image and Pentagram remained unsigned.

On December 16, 1975, Liebling and his girlfriend were arrested, leading to the other members of the band meeting on New Year's Eve to discuss their status. The decision was made that the rest of the band would quit Pentagram because Liebling owned the rights for the name "Pentagram", and they could not continue under that name without him. The remaining members unsuccessfully auditioned singers during much of 1976 before recruiting Marty Iverson as a second guitarist in the summer of 1976, and deciding to give Liebling a second chance. However, after beginning a recording session at Underground Sound in Largo, Maryland, the band split from Liebling again, leaving the sessions unfinished and unmixed.

For much of their career, Pentagram rehearsed at the American Mailing warehouse in Alexandria, due to the fact that both Liebling and O'Keefe lived in high-rise apartments. The latter's father, George O'Keefe, was an executive at American Mailing. The younger O'Keefe had used this location for many of his previous musical projects, whether on his own or with Space Meat. At the warehouse, the group was able to have a good practice room to store their equipment and play loudly without the worry of complaining neighbors. Many of these early rehearsals were recorded on O'Keefe's reel-to-reel tape recorder. The resulting rehearsal tapes, featuring the many early line-ups the group went through in the early 1970s, were later traded extensively among Pentagram fans. When American Mailing moved locations, Pentagram eventually moved to rehearse at Mayne's house, which he was renting with an old friend, locally renowned keyboardist Knox Cockrell.

Pentagram's first 7-inch, "Be Forewarned", was released under the name Macabre and included "Lazy Lady" on the B-side. The record was produced by Phillip Knudsen and released on Intermedia (TBSM 003). This recording ended up being one of the band's only proper releases, although a promotional 7" of the song "Hurricane" (Boffo Socko R13859) was also released during that time. A large number of demo and rehearsal recordings (as well as 22 unreleased studio recordings) exist from this time period. Despite the handful of recorded material, Pentagram's repertoire reportedly consisted of nearly 80 original songs, written or co-written by Liebling, as well as covers such as "Under My Thumb" by the Rolling Stones and the Yardbirds' version of "Little Games."

Demos recorded by Pentagram included:
A three-track demo recorded at Columbia Studios in New York, New York on September 20, 1975 (featuring "Run My Course", "When the Screams Come" and "Wheel of Fortune")
A 12-track demo recorded at the American Mailing Warehouse in Alexandria, Virginia in December 1972 and on February 2, 1973 (featuring "Virgin Death", "Yes I Do", "Ask No More", "Man", "Be Forewarned", "Catwalk", "Die in Your Sleep", "Forever My Queen", "Review Your Choices", "Walk in the Blue Light" and "Downhill Slope").
A five-track demo recorded at Underground Sound in Largo, Maryland, on September 4, 12 and 23, 1976 (featuring "Smokescreen", "Teaser", "Much Too Young to Know", "Little Games" and "Starlady").

Many of these demos would appear on the semi-authorized 1972–1979 compilation, the bootleg follow-up 1972–1979 (Vol. 2) and the hard-to-find (albeit official) Human Hurricane compilation. In 2001, Relapse Records issued an authorized compilation of 12 early tracks, three of which were live rehearsal recordings, titled First Daze Here (The Vintage Collection). Following the compilation's success, Relapse released First Daze Here Too in 2006, a two-disc, 22-track compilation of additional unreleased material.

High Voltage era
After O'Keefe, McAllister, and Mayne split from Liebling, a new line-up consisting of Liebling (vocals), Randy Palmer (guitar) and John Ossea (drums) began rehearsing in the basement of a dentist's office. Bass players in that period included Rick Marinari, who went on to join Albatross, and Vance Bockis, later of The Obsessed. However, this line-up folded after only a couple of months and Liebling was once again band-less.

On Halloween 1978, the singer bumped into his friend Joe Hasselvander at the Louie's Rock City club in Falls Church, Virginia while seeing Sex, a band featuring ex-members of both Pentagram and The Boyz (Hasselvander's previous band). Hasselvander was playing in a singer-less group consisting of himself (drums), Richard Kueht (guitar), Paul Trowbridge (guitar), and Marty Swaney (bass). Liebling soon joined, and in less than a week they would take on the Pentagram moniker and begin performing Liebling's material from the previous Pentagram line-up. This configuration played several shows and released a 7" single of "Livin' in a Ram's Head" in 1979, but personal problems caused this line-up to dissolve later that year. It is generally referred to as the "High Voltage era" of Pentagram.

The 1980s and 1990s

Death Row, Pentagram reformed: the doom era 
In 1980, bassist Lee Abney and guitarist Victor Griffin formed a Knoxville, Tennessee (later based in Northern Virginia) doom metal band named Death Row. Shortly thereafter, drummer Hasselvander joined, and the group recruited Liebling on vocals. Former member Swaney soon replaced Abney on bass and the classic Death Row line-up was forged. Following two demos in 1982 and 1983, Hasselvander left the band in 1984. Stuart Rose was picked as his replacement, and the band soon assumed the Pentagram mantle. The 1982 demo, All Your Sins, was then remixed and partially re-recorded in 1984 for release in 1985 as the band's eponymous debut album. The 1983 demo, along with several live recordings from 1982 and 1983 and the band's first jam from 1981, were collected and released via Black Widow in 2009 as a double CD, Alive in Death.

In 1985, the band finally released their first studio album, featuring the "Death Row" material and line-up of Liebling on vocals, Griffin on guitar, Swaney on bass and Rose on drums. Initially self-titled, the album was often referred to as Relentless due to it being renamed when it was reissued by Peaceville Records. The album contained a mix of new songs and 1970s-era songs, as did all of the following Pentagram albums. The record's heavier sound and obscure lyrical themes helped cement Pentagram's reputation as one of the pioneers of the classic doom metal style. After recording their second album Day of Reckoning, the band folded yet again. In 1989, 1970s-era members Mayne and Palmer re-joined Liebling with the addition of Ted Feldman on guitar and John Cook on drums. The band was working on recording a third LP, but shortly after their first performance in Maryland, they split up in 1990.

The previous "classic" line-up of Liebling, Griffin, Swaney and Hasselvander reformed in 1993, and Peaceville Records reissued the first two albums. During this same time, Peace Records released the semi-legitimate 1972–1979. This was the first time many of the 1970s-era songs were released. In 1994, they released their third full-length album, Be Forewarned. Griffin and Hasselvander briefly joined UK doom band Cathedral as live musicians in 1994. Bassist Greg Turley and drummer Gary Isom occasionally performed live with the band in this era, filling in for Swaney and Hasselvander.

Liebling/Hasselvander du-o, more changes and crisis 
Pentagram split up again, and in 1996, a new line-up was forged, consisting of Liebling on vocals, Hasselvander on drums and new members Greg Reeder on guitar and Ned Meloni on bass. This line-up recorded a demo, Change of Heart. Shortly afterward, Pentagram re-emerged as a duo, with Liebling retaining vocal duties and Hasselvander taking care of all instrumentation. In 1998, Downtime Records released a number of early recordings on a compilation album titled Human Hurricane, and 1972–1979 (Vol. 2), a bootleg follow up to 1972–1979, was released in 1999 by Peace Records.

Liebling and Hasselvander recorded both 1999's Review Your Choices and 2001's Sub-Basement as a duo. In-between those albums, a brief live reunion of the Death Row classic line-up took place with Liebling, Griffin, Hasselvander and Abney. The duo of Liebling and Hasselvander occasionally performed live as Pentagram during this period, assisted by bassist Walter White and drummer Dale Russell.

In 2001, Relapse Records issued First Daze Here (The Vintage Collection), a compilation consisting of unreleased material from the 1970s. In 2002, Peaceville Records released a compilation of songs from the first three albums titled Turn to Stone. Peaceville re-released the band's first three albums on CD in digipak format in 2005.

Shortly after Sub-Basement Hasselvander split with Liebling, who soon recruited guitarist Kelly Carmichael, bassist Adam Heinzmann, and drummer Mike Smail, all members of doom metal band Internal Void. This new line-up recorded Show 'Em How in 2004, an album that featured seven rerecorded 1970s-era Pentagram songs along with three new originals.

In 2006, Relapse released- a second compilation of unreleased 1970s material, First Daze Here Too. These reissues ensured that Pentagram's early material and albums were finally widely available.

After Show 'Em How, the band remained in limbo for some time due to Liebling's unstable behavior and drug addiction, including collapsing in the intro to an important show at D.C.'s Black Cat, forcing the band to recruit Hasselvander and others from the audience to perform in his stead.

The 2000s, 2010s and 2020s

Resurgence 
 In July 2000, former members Griffin and Abney formed Place of Skulls, following their departure from Pentagram. Place of Skulls briefly featured doom metal legend Scott "Wino" Weinrich on their 2003 With Vision album, though he later left to concentrate on the Hidden Hand. Abney left in 2002 but returned in 2007.

Palmer died in 2002 from injuries suffered in a car crash, while McAllister died in May 2006 from cancer.

Hank Williams III included renditions of the classic versions of Pentagram's "Be Forewarned" and "Forever My Queen" in his live set. During his performance at the Black Cat club in 2006, Liebling joined Williams onstage and performed the songs himself. On September 15, 2006, Liebling joined Witchcraft onstage at a show at The Rock and Roll Hotel in D.C. to sing Pentagram covers "When the Screams Come" and "Yes I Do".

Hasselvander's solo project The Hounds of Hasselvander released an album in 2007. For live performances, Hasselvander recruited Kayt Vigil on bass and former Pentagram drummer and Maryland doom mainstay Isom on drums. Hasselvander also contributed to Blue Cheer's 2007 album, What Doesn't Kill You.

On August 23, 2008, a new Pentagram line-up was announced, which featured Liebling joined by guitarist Russ Strahan, former live drummer Isom and bassist Mark Ammen, who came in after a short period with Kayt Vigil.

In 2009, the band played two triumphant shows in New York City and Baltimore. The New York show was filmed for the documentary Last Days Here. Due to the success of these shows, the band embarked on a seven-date mini-tour which included two sold-out shows in Chicago, plus dates in Seattle, Portland, Austin, San Francisco, and West Hollywood.

On March 14, 2010, Strahan abruptly left the band one day before a spring tour was to begin. Scrambling to find a guitarist, Liebling contacted Johnny "Wretched" Koutsioukis of Wretched fame to replace Strahan on lead guitar. Wretched had limited time to learn the material and for the first few shows, the setlist was cut short. He left after those gigs.

For Pentagram's May 2010 tour dates (which concluded with Maryland Deathfest), Griffin once again joined Liebling, Turley and Isom on what was intended to be a temporary basis, solely for the tour. He instead became a permanent member again and remained with the band for nearly three more years.

Last Days Here documentary 

Last Days Here is a documentary film featuring the daily struggles of Bobby Liebling, the lead singer, songwriter and cofounder of Pentagram, as he and others attempt to get his life back together. The documentary features interviews with prior members of the band as well as Liebling's parents and friends; the roles of his friend Sean "Pellet" Pelletier and his girlfriend Hallie, who became Liebling's wife; and the band's successful 2009 stage comeback.

The film was directed by Don Argott and Demian Fenton from 9.14 Pictures, best known for their documentaries Rock School and The Art of the Steal. Sundance Selects, a subsidiary of IFC Films, purchased the film with plans to release it theatrically in the winter of 2012.

In 2011, the documentary toured the film festival circuit, debuting at the prestigious SXSW Film Festival as well as playing at the Independent Film Festival of Boston, where it won the Grand Jury Prize. Other festival cities included Chicago; Sarasota, Florida; and Columbia, Missouri, as well as stops in Canada, Sweden, Denmark and Australia. At the 2011 International Documentary Film Festival Amsterdam, it won the prize for Best Music Documentary.

Last Rites and Curious Volume 

In February 2011, Metal Blade Records announced that Pentagram would play South by Southwest in March 2011, followed by a European tour beginning on April 14, 2011, at Roadburn Festival in the Netherlands. The line-up included Griffin on guitar, Turley on bass, and Albert Born on drums. Born soon left the group and was replaced by Tim Tomaselli (Place of Skulls).

Last Rites, released April 12, 2011, featured the studio return of Griffin after more than 15 years. Turley and Tomaselli also played on the album, which sparked renewed worldwide interest in Pentagram.

In June 2012, Pentagram announced that drummer Sean Saley had joined the band. At the end of that year, they announced an amicable split with Griffin. In April 2013, Pentagram unveiled the name of his successor: Matt Goldsborough, a member of the Philadelphia-based band The Great Unknown.

Pentagram played several shows in the U.S. and toured Europe heavily during 2012 and 2013, including dates in the UK, Germany, Norway, Switzerland, Sweden, Austria, France, Slovenia, Greece, Italy and Spain.

In January 2014, the band announced that guitarist Griffin had re-joined Pentagram after a one-year break. Upon Griffin's return, Pentagram embarked on a U.S. West Coast tour in February 2014, covering Seattle, Portland, San Francisco, Las Vegas, Albuquerque, Denver, Salt Lake City, and Los Angeles. Pentagram also made appearances in Finland and Sweden in May 2014. In February 2015, new drummer Pete "Minnesota" Campbell, previously in Griffin's In-Graved, was announced, as well as a new album, titled Curious Volume, which was released on August 21.

Liebling's arrest and return 
In April 2017, following a period of stability and extensive touring, the band announced that it would play several East Coast dates without Liebling, as a trio of Griffin, Turley and Campbell, with Griffin on vocals. While it was widely speculated that Liebling had entered rehab due to a drug relapse, the singer was in fact arrested and arraigned on charges of first-degree assault and vulnerable adult abuse with physical injury. In October of that year, Liebling plead guilty to "abuse and neglect of a vulnerable adult custodian", and was sentenced to 18 months at the Montgomery County Detention Center.

Pentagram resurfaced in January 2019, announcing new live activity and the return of vocalist Bobby Liebling and guitarist Matt Goldsborough in place of the again departing Victor Griffin. They embarked on their first US tour with Liebling since his arrest in the spring of 2019, and a new album by the band is in the works.

Personnel

Current members
Bobby Liebling – vocals (1971–2005, 2008–2017, 2019–present) 
Matt Goldsborough – guitar (2013–2014, 2015, 2019–present)
Greg Turley – bass (1995–1996, 2010–present)
"Minnesota" Pete Campbell – drums (2015–2020, 2021–present)

Live members
 Ryan Manning - drums (2022–present) (live)

Former members

Guitar
Vincent McAllister – bass (1971), guitar (1971–1976; died 2006)
John Jennings – guitar (1971; died 2015)
Randy Palmer – guitar (1974–1975, 1988–1989; died 2002)
Marty Iverson – guitar (1976–1977)
Richard Kueht – guitar (1978–1979)
Paul Trowbridge – guitar (1978–1979)
Victor Griffin – guitar (1983–1988, 1993–1996, 2010–2012, 2014–2019); vocals (2017–2019)
Ted Feldman – guitar (1988–1989) 
Greg Reeder – guitar (1996) 
Kelly Carmichael – guitar (2003–2005)
Russ Strahan – guitar (2008–2010)
Johnny "Wretched" Koutsioukis – guitar (2010)

Bass
Greg Mayne – bass (1971–1976, 1988–1989; died 2021)
Rick Marinari – bass (1976–1977)
Martin Swaney – bass (1978–1979, 1983–1988, 1993–1995)
Vance Bockis – bass (1979; died 2012)
Ned Meloni – bass (1996)
Walter White – bass (2001)  
Adam Heinzmann – bass (2003–2005)
Kayt Vigil – bass (2008) 
Mark Ammen – bass (2008–2010)

Drums
Geof O'Keefe – drums (1971–1977), guitar (1971)
Steve Martin – drums (1971)
John Ossea – drums (1977, died 1989)
Joe Hasselvander – drums (1978–1985, 1993–2002), bass, guitars (1996–2002)
Stuart Rose – drums (1985–1988; died 2016)
John Cook – drums (1989)
Gary Isom – drums (1995–1996, 2008–2010)
Dale Russell – drums (2001)  
Mike Smail – drums (2003–2005) 
Albert Born – drums (2011)
Tim Tomaselli – drums (2010–2011)
Sean Saley – drums (2012–2015)

Several of the personnel listed above were not permanent members, with some having only played on a demo as session musicians, or having played few or no live shows.

Timeline

Discography

Studio albums
Pentagram (1985, Pentagram Records), reissued as Relentless (1993, Peaceville Records)
Day of Reckoning (1987, Napalm Records)
Be Forewarned (1994, Peaceville Records)
Review Your Choices (1999, Black Widow Records)
Sub-Basement (2001, Black Widow Records)
Show 'Em How (2004, Black Widow Records)
Last Rites (2011, Metal Blade Records)
Curious Volume (2015, Peaceville Records)

Singles and EPs
"Be Forewarned" / "Lazy Lady" 7" as Macabre (1972, Intermedia Productions)
"Hurricane" / "Earth Flight" 7" (1973, Boffo Socko)
"Under My Thumb" / "When the Screams Come" 7" (1973, Gemini)
"Livin' in a Ram's Head" / "When the Screams Come" 7" (1979, High Voltage Records)
"Relentless" / "Day of Reckoning" 7" (1993, Peaceville Records)
Change of Heart 12" EP (2012, Iron Pegasus Records)
"Bang It Out (1971 Rehearsal)" flexi (2015, Decibel Flexi Series)

Live albums
A Keg Full of Dynamite (2003, Black Widow Records)
Live Rites (2011, Svart Records)

Compilation albums
1972–1979 (1993, Peace Records)
Relentless/Day of Reckoning (1993, Peaceville Records)
Human Hurricane (1998, Downtime Recordings)
1972–1979 (Vol. 2) (1999, Peace Records)
First Daze Here (The Vintage Collection) (2001, Relapse Records) 
Turn to Stone (2002, Peaceville Records)
First Daze Here Too (2006, Relapse Records) 
If the Winds Would Change (2011, High Roller Records)

Compilation appearances
"Doctor Please" and "Feather From Your Tree" (Blue Cheer covers) on Blue Explosion: A Tribute to Blue Cheer (1999, Black Widow Records)
"Dancing Madly Backwards (On a Sea of Air)" (Captain Beyond cover) on Thousand Days of Yesterdays: A Tribute to Captain Beyond (1999, Record Heaven Music)
"Flaming" (Syd Barrett cover) on Like Black Holes in the Sky: A Tribute to Syd Barrett (2008, Dwell Records)
"Little Games" (The Yardbirds cover) on Heavy Nuggets III (15 Gems from the Hard Rock Underground) (2014, Respect Music)
"Tomorrow's Dream" (Black Sabbath cover) on Sweet Leaf: A Stoner Rock Salute to Black Sabbath (2015, Deadline Music)

DVDs
When the Screams Come (2011, Metal Blade Records)
Last Days Here (2011, MPI Media Group)
All Your Sins (Video Vault) (2015, Peaceville Records)

Bedemon
Bedemon was an offshoot of Pentagram, beginning circa 1973. The name was chosen as a portmanteau of two earlier suggested names, Demon and Behemoth. Prior to joining Pentagram, Randy Palmer and his friend Mike Matthews along with Bobby Liebling and Geof O'Keefe (then current members of Pentagram) got together to record some of Palmer's compositions. The first session resulted in three songs: "Child of Darkness", "Serpent Venom" and "Frozen Fear". After a short time, the group reconvened and recorded additional tracks. When Palmer officially joined Pentagram, he brought two tracks with him, "Starlady" and "Touch the Sky". After Palmer's departure from Pentagram, Bedemon reformed in 1979 to record three more songs: "Time Bomb", "Nighttime Killer", and an unnamed composition by O'Keefe. A slightly different line-up (featuring former Pentagram member Greg Mayne on bass) recorded "Night of the Demon" along with some older songs in 1986.

Many songs from the Bedemon sessions were released on various bootlegs throughout the years, but were never officially released until 2005, when Black Widow Records issued Child of Darkness.

By 2002, Bedemon leader Palmer along with Matthews and O'Keefe had already reunited to record nine new original Bedemon songs. A few months after basic tracks were recorded, Palmer was killed in an automobile accident. Matthews and O'Keefe, along with vocalist Craig Junghandel (whom Palmer had selected prior to his accident), completed and mastered the songs in 2010. The album, titled Symphony of Shadows, was released in August 2012 on Svart Records and received excellent reviews from critics.

On May 14, 2015, Bedemon announced their first ever live performance would take place on May 15 at the Psycho California festival in Santa Ana, California, with a band line-up of O'Keefe on guitar, fellow ex-Pentagram member Greg Mayne on bass, drummer Frank Hayes and Saint Vitus frontman Scott Weinrich on vocals.

References

External links

Official website
Pentagram page at The Metal Archives

 
 

Pentagram live photo archive at Barbara Pereman's Rock-O-Graphy

American doom metal musical groups
Relapse Records artists
Heavy metal musical groups from Virginia
Musical groups established in 1971
Musical groups disestablished in 2005
Musical groups reestablished in 2008
Heavy metal musical groups from Washington, D.C.
Black Widow Records artists